Mark Norelius (born June 10, 1952) is an American former rower. He competed in the men's eight event at the 1976 Summer Olympics.

References

External links
 

1952 births
Living people
American male rowers
Olympic rowers of the United States
Rowers at the 1976 Summer Olympics
Rowers from Seattle
World Rowing Championships medalists for the United States